Kharaj Mukherjee or Kharaj Mukhopadhyay (born 7 July 1963) is an Indian actor. He completed his early education from St. Lawrence High School, Kolkata He made his debut in Bengali film with the film Hulusthul in 1980. In the last 32 years, he has worked in many films like Patalghar, Bye Bye Bangkok, Kahani, Namesake, Accident, Muktodhara, Special 26, Lafangey Parindey, Yuva, Parineeta, Laga Chunari Mein Daag, Chha-e Chhuti, Jaatishwar etc. He is a student of the drama maestro Ramaprasad Banik. He is known for his excellence in both Commercial and natural acting. In 2012 film Kahaani, Mukherjee played the role of Inspector Chatterjee. Mukherjee won Bengal Film Journalists' Association – Best Male Playback Award in 2004 for the film Patalghar. Over the years, he has established himself as one of the finest actors in the Bengali film industry due to his versatility in various roles. His son, Bihu Mukherjee debuted in the film Abar Basanta Bilap.

Filmography

Web series
 Kamini
 Rahasya Romancho
 Feluda Pherot
 Ray
 Byadh

See also 

 Chhabi Biswas, Bengali actor
 Rajatava Dutta, Bengali film and television actor

References

External links

 Kharaj Mukherjee Filmography on The Times of India

Bengali male actors
Bengali male television actors
University of Calcutta alumni
Male actors in Bengali cinema
21st-century Indian male actors
Indian male film actors
Male actors from Kolkata

Living people
1963 births